Hayley Lovitt (born December 26, 1986) is an American actress and production coordinator. She is known for her portrayal as younger Janet van Dyne / The Wasp in Ant-Man (2015) and its sequel Ant-Man and the Wasp (2018) and for her portrayal as Sage on The Gifted.

Life and career
Lovitt was born in Oklahoma and moved to North Carolina when she was in middle school. Her love for acting came about throughout her youth. She attended and graduated at University of North Carolina at Wilmington. She initially majored in Communication Studies and Psychology and considered becoming an attorney. She began to work professionally in 2009 in front of the camera and behind the scenes on film crew. Lovitt gained fame for her brief portrayal of Janet van Dyne / The Wasp in the film Ant-Man. She has continued to make appearances in comic-book-based properties such as The Gifted as the character Sage.

She also worked as a Production Assistant, Costumer and Production Coordinator for many years before turning to act full-time.

Lovitt is an animal lover and helps out at animal shelters.

Filmography

Film

Television

References

External links
 

Living people
1986 births
Actresses from Oklahoma
University of North Carolina alumni
21st-century American women